The Indo-Pacific blue marlin (Makaira mazara) is a species of marlin belonging to the family Istiophoridae.

Taxonomy
Makaira mazara is closely related to, and usually considered conspecific with, the Atlantic blue marlin, then simply called blue marlin.

The classification of the Indo-Pacific blue marlin (M. mazara) and the Atlantic blue marlin (M. nigricans) as separate species is under debate. Genetic data suggest, although the two groups are isolated from each other, that they are both the same species, with the only genetic exchange occurring when Indo-Pacific blue marlin migrate to and contribute genes to the Atlantic population. A separate study by V. P. Buonaccorsi, J. R. Mcdowell, and Graves indicated that both Indo-Pacific and Atlantic show "striking phylogeographic partitioning" of mitochondrial and microsatellite loci. Some authorities still consider them both distinct.

Distribution and habitat
This species can be found throughout  the  tropical and sub-tropical waters of the Pacific and Indian Oceans. Warm currents such as the Agulhas Current in the western Indian Ocean have a major influence on their seasonal distribution. It is common in equatorial waters, but it is not usually seen close to islands and coral reefs. It is considered the most tropical billfish species.

Description
The body is elongated but it is not very compressed, with two dorsal fins and two anal fins. The dorsal fins have a total of 40 to 45 soft rays, while the anal fins have 18 to 24 soft rays. The pectoral fins, which have 21 to 23 rays, are falcate and flexible, and can be drawn in to the sides of the body. The nape is highly elevated. The upper jaw forms a robust but not very long beak, round in cross section. The caudal peduncle shows strong double keels on each side. The body color is blue-black dorsally and silvery white ventrally, sometimes with light blue vertical stripes.

Biology
Spawning takes place during summer in both the Indian and Pacific Oceans. In the southern hemisphere, spawning probably occurs around French Polynesia. Makaira mazara is a highly migratory species. These marlins use their bill for inflicting wounds on their prey.

References

Makaira
Sport fish
Fish described in 1901
Taxa named by David Starr Jordan
Taxa named by John Otterbein Snyder